All Star Road Band Volume 2 is a live album by American pianist, composer and bandleader Duke Ellington recorded at the Holiday Ballroom in Chicago for radio broadcast and first released as a double LP on Bob Thiele's Doctor Jazz label in 1985.

Reception

The Allmusic review by Scott Yanow stated "This two-LP set finds Duke Ellington's orchestra in surprisingly inspired form playing at a dance in Chicago ... the all-star ensemble brings new life to the potentially tired repertoire, introduces some relatively new arrangements and seems to have a good time playing for an enthusiastic audience. Excellent music".

Track listing
All compositions by Duke Ellington except where noted

Disc 1
 "Mood Indigo" (Ellington, Barney Bigard, Irving Mills) - 6:45
 "Satin Doll" (Ellington, Billy Strayhorn, Johnny Mercer) – 4:04
 "Happy Go Lucky Local" – 8:05
 "Medley: Things Ain't What They Used to Be / Do Nothing till You Hear from Me" (Mercer Ellington, Ted Persons / Ellington, Bob Russell) – 5:14
 "Guitar Amour" – 5:32
 "Summertime" (George Gershwin, Ira Gershwin) – 1:57
 "C Jam Blues" – 4:17
 "Silk Lace" – 4:44

Disc 2
 "I Got It Bad (and That Ain't Good)" (Ellington, Paul Francis Webster) – 3:29
 "Isfahan" (Ellington, Strayhorn) – 3:34
 "Timon of Athens" – 2:42
 "Tutti for Cootie" (Ellington, Jimmy Hamilton) – 5:54
 "Stomping at the Savoy" (Edgar Sampson, Benny Goodman, Chick Webb, Andy Razaf) – 4:07
 "Jeep's Blues" (Ellington, Johnny Hodges) – 4:40
 "I Can't Stop Loving You" (Don Gibson) – 5:56
 "Diminuendo and Crescendo in Blue" – 6:59
 "Satin Doll" (Ellington, Strayhorn, Johnny Mercer) – 1:44

Personnel
Duke Ellington – piano 
Cat Anderson, Herbie Jones, Cootie Williams, Nat Woodard – trumpet
Lawrence Brown, Buster Cooper – trombone 
Chuck Connors – bass trombone 
Jimmy Hamilton – clarinet, tenor saxophone
Johnny Hodges – alto saxophone 
Russell Procope – alto saxophone, clarinet
Paul Gonsalves – tenor saxophone
Harry Carney – baritone saxophone
Peck Morrison – bass 
Sam Woodyard – drums

References

1985 live albums
Duke Ellington live albums
Albums produced by Bob Thiele
Doctor Jazz Records live albums